Stanislas Guerini (born 14 May 1982) is a French politician who is serving as Minister of Public Transformation and Service in the government of Prime Minister Élisabeth Borne since 2022. 

Prior to entering government, Guerini served as Executive Officer of La République En Marche! (LREM) since 2018. He succeeded Christophe Castaner, who had resigned after he was appointed Minister of the Interior by President Emmanuel Macron. From 2017 to 2022, Guerini was the member of the National Assembly for the 3rd constituency of Paris, which covers parts of the 17th and 18th arrondissements.

Early life and education
One of his grandfathers, an Italian immigrant, fled the Fascist regime to settle in France.

Guerini established his company Watt & Home, a company selling and installing solar panels, founded in 2007. At the end of 2013, he left his position of general manager of Watt and Home and becomes "director of the customer experience" of the multinational Elis, company in the field of cleaning and hygiene (Industrial Laundry).

Political career

Socialist Party
Guerini was associated with Dominique Strauss-Kahn's campaign team for the Socialist Party presidential primary of 2006.

Member of the National Assembly
Guerini was elected for La République en marche! in the 2017 legislative election in the 3rd constituency of Paris. He won 45.08% of the votes in the first round, then won in the second round against the UDI's candidate Valérie Nahmias with 65.50% of the votes.

In the National Assembly, from 29 June 2017 to 17 January 2019, Guerini served on the Finance, General Economy and Budgetary Monitoring Committees. Currently, he is a member of the Committee on National Defence and Armed Forces. In addition to his committee assignments, he was also part of one of the expert group commissioned by Bruno Le Maire to lead the preparatory work for the Action Plan for Business Growth and Transformation.

In 2019, Guerini's office was vandalised during anti-government protests of the Yellow vests movement.

REM Executive Officer
In October 2018, Guerini announced his candidacy to succeed Christophe Castaner as Executive Officer of La République En Marche!. On 1 December 2018, he was elected executive officer of La République En Marche!, with 82% of the votes against Joachim Son-Forget.

Political positions
In July 2019, Guerini voted in favor of the French ratification of the European Union’s Comprehensive Economic and Trade Agreement (CETA) with Canada.

When National Rally MEP Jordan Bardella tweeted criticism of Muslim LREM candidate Sara Zemmahi for wearing a hijab in a campaign poster, Guerini responded in agreement and Zammahi was barred from running as a LREM candidate. Guerini claimed that "wearing ostentatious religious symbols on a campaign document is not compatible with the values of LREM". This was condemned by fellow LREM deputies Coralie Dubost and Caroline Janvier.

References

1982 births
Living people
Deputies of the 15th National Assembly of the French Fifth Republic
La République En Marche! politicians
Politicians from Paris
Lycée Henri-IV alumni
HEC Paris alumni
French people of Italian descent
Members of the Borne government